The European Scout Federation (British Association) is a Traditional Scouting youth organisation.  It is a part of the other Scouting in the United Kingdom. Original test work set out by Robert Baden-Powell is still used.  The original uniform is still evident today, broad brimmed hats, khaki shirts and shorts, making the wearer instantly recognisable as a Scout.

History
The European Scout Federation (British Association) is one of the organisations that founded the CES after leaving the Fédération du Scoutisme Européen (FSE), later renamed to the Union Internationale des Guides et Scouts d'Europe, 
The Badge of the Association consists of a gold fleur-de-Lys on a red Cross Pattée, with a blue background, the old badge of the FSE.

Sections

Membership
Total Membership in 2015: 516
Otters:  67
Cubs: 190
Scouts: 126
Rovers:  82
Adult Members: 4
Leaders:  47 - does not include Rovers who are also Leaders

Groups
Central Province
1st / 2nd Derbyshire
3rd / 4th Derbyshire
5th / 6th Derbyshire
1st / 2nd Gloucestershire
East Pennine Province
1st / 2nd Yorkshire
Iceni Province
1st / 2nd Cambridgeshire (Girton)
7th / 8th Cambridgeshire (St. Ives)
1st / 2nd Essex (Great Chesterford)
West Pennine Province
1st Lancashire based at Prestwich, Greater Manchester
2nd Lancashire based at Higher Blackley, Manchester
3rd/4th Lancashire based at Newton Heath, Manchester
5th Lancashire based at Higher Blackley, Manchester
6th/15th Lancashire based at Middleton, Greater Manchester
1st Cumberland based at Heads Nook, Brampton, Cumbria

Links 
https://www.fse-scouts.eu

References 

Non-aligned Scouting organizations
Scouting and Guiding in the United Kingdom
Youth organizations established in 1959
1959 establishments in the United Kingdom